The Touch may refer to:

In film:
 The Touch (1971 film), a Swedish film by Ingmar Bergman
 The Touch (2002 film), a Hong Kong film starring Michelle Yeoh

In literature:
 The Touch (McCullough novel), a novel by Colleen McCullough
 The Touch (Wilson novel), a novel by F. Paul Wilson
 The Touch, a novel by Daniel Keyes
 The Touch, a novel by Julie Myerson

In music:
 The Touch (album), an album by Alabama
 "The Touch" (Kim Wilde song), from the 1984 album Teases & Dares
 "The Touch" (Stan Bush song), from the 1986 album The Transformers The Movie soundtrack
 The Touch (radio network), a 24-hour music format
 "The Touch", a song by Maria Arredondo

In theater:

See also
 Touch (disambiguation)